This Beautiful Mess is the second studio album by American band Sixpence None the Richer, released in 1995 (see 1995 in music). The recording was produced by Armand John Petri, who also managed the band from 1993 to 1997. This Beautiful Mess surpassed 50,000 copies sold during its first year of release and laid the foundation for Sixpence's self-titled breakout album two years later. This Beautiful Mess won the 1996 Dove Award for "Alternative/Modern Rock Album of the Year." The songs "Within a Room Somewhere" and "I Can't Explain" were both minor hits on the Christian music charts.

Within a couple years of the album's release, two eventually significant rock bands formed under the moniker "This Beautiful Mess." The first originated in Colorado Springs, Colorado in 1996 and went on to become the platinum-selling act OneRepublic. The second, formed in 1997, is the Dutch rock quintet from the Netherlands which continues making music under the same name.

"This Beautiful Mess" is also used as the title of author Rick McKinley's 2006 treatise on personal and social transformation. The book's foreword was written by author Donald Miller, whose book he turned into a screenplay in 2012 for Blue Like Jazz, that was directed by Steve Taylor, who produced this album.

Track listing

Personnel 
 Leigh Nash – vocals
 Matt Slocum – guitars, cello
 Tess Wiley – guitars, vocals
 J.J. Plasencio – bass
 Dale Baker – drums

Production
 Armand John Petri – producer, engineer, mixing
 Bryan Lenox – basic track engineer, mixing
 Scott Lenox – assistant engineer
 Aaron Swihart – assistant engineer
 Tyler Bacon – executive producer
 Gavin Morkel – executive producer
 Duncan Stanbury – mastering
 Jeff Spencer – digital prepress, design assistant at Nosegrind Creative
 Kim Thomas – cover painting 
 Chris Taylor – title
 Ben Pearson – photography

References 

Sixpence None the Richer albums
1995 albums
R.E.X. Records albums